Sock Dennis is an historic manor in the parish of Ilchester in Somerset, England.

History
In the Domesday Book of 1086 the manor of Sock Dennis was in the possession of Robert, Count of Mortain. From the mid-13th century it was described as a manor, but by the end of the 18th century it was "an obliterated place". The place name derives from "Sock", probably an area of marsh or streams, and the family name of the successors of William the Dane, a 12th-century owner. The family of Dennis was apparently of Danish origin, and was recorded in early Norman charters in French as le Deneys, meaning "The Dane", which was frequently Latinised by scribes as Dacus, being the adjectival form of Dacia, the mediaeval Latin for Denmark, thus "Danish".

There is an area of well-preserved ridge and furrow earthworks over three fields to the east of Sock Dennis.

There was a church in the village of Sock Dennis in 1286. It was a daughter church of Yeovil. In 1297 the church was worth £7 15s. The church had disappeared by 1575. A doorway, probably of the early 16th century, and perhaps forming part of the fabric of the church, is incorporated in one of the buildings of Sock Dennis farm, which is all that now remains of the village.

In 1861 Sock Dennis's total population was 26. In 1901 it was 22. By 1951 the population was 23.

After the church in Sock Dennis was destroyed, and the place was almost depopulated, it lost its parochial rights. In 1884 it was reduced, in order to enlarge the parish of Tintinhull.

References

Manors in Somerset